A Very Special Acoustic Christmas is the sixth in the A Very Special Christmas series of Christmas music-themed compilation albums produced to benefit the Special Olympics. The album was released in 2003 by Lost Highway Records.  As opposed to earlier editions that contained a wide variety of musical styles, this edition of A Very Special Christmas featured primarily country and bluegrass artists. It also uses cover art unique to the series, minimizing the Keith Haring artwork that serves as the series trademark. It peaked at #159 on December 2003 Billboard album chart.

Allmusic rated it 3.5 stars out of 5.

Track listing
 "Silent Night" – Reba McEntire
 "Frosty the Snowman" – Dan Tyminski
 "Please Come Home for Christmas" – Willie Nelson
 "Just Put a Ribbon in Your Hair" – Alan Jackson
 "Only You Can Bring Me Cheer (Gentleman`s Lady)" – Alison Krauss
 "Even Santa Claus Gets the Blues" – Marty Stuart
 "Jingle Bells" – Earl Scruggs
 "Christmas Is Near" – Ralph Stanley
 "O Come All Ye Faithful" – Patty Loveless
 "O Holy Night" – Wynonna Judd
 "Winter Wonderland" – Pat Green
 "Let It Snow, Let It Snow, Let It Snow" – Sam Bush
 "Away in a Manger" – Ricky Skaggs
 "Christmas Time at Home" – Rhonda Vincent
 "I'll Be Home For Christmas" – Tift Merritt
 "Peace" – Norah Jones

Release history

Chart performance

References

External links
A Very Special Acoustic Christmas at A Very Special Christmas Official Website
A Very Special Christmas Official Website
A Very Special Acoustic Christmas at Amazon.com

2003 Christmas albums
Christmas albums by American artists
Lost Highway Records compilation albums
2003 compilation albums
Country music compilation albums
Country Christmas albums
A Very Special Christmas